Alexandre "Gigi" Paiva (born March 4, 1967, Rio de Janeiro, Brazil) is a long standing figure, having been involved in Jiu Jitsu since the early 1980s, in the Brazilian jiu-jitsu community who has made a number of important contributions to the sport which are referenced below.

He began training when he was 15 years old in Romero "Jacare" Cavalcanti's school, where he was considered to be one of the academy's most technically gifted students, and received his Black Belt in 1993.  

In addition to being an outstanding competitive athlete winning the World Jiu-Jitsu Championship 1x at Adult level and 4x at Masters level he also, alongside Romero "Jacare" Cavalcanti and Fabio Gurgel, co-founded the Alliance Jiu Jitsu Team which has gone on to become the most successful competitive Brazilian Jiu-Jitsu team of all time.

The following athletes are included in the list of IBJJF World Champions he has trained - Fernando Augusto,  Leo Leite, his son Victor Genovesi and Tayane Porfirio.

He is currently head coach at  Alliance Jiu Jitsu Eagle Academy located in Eagle, Idaho USA.

Instructor lineage 
Mitsuyo "Count Koma" Maeda → Carlos Gracie, Sr. → Helio Gracie → Rolls Gracie → Romero "Jacare" Cavalcanti → Alexandre "Gigi" Paiva

References

External links 
Alliance Jiu Jitsu Rio de Janeiro
BJJ Heroes Alexandre Paiva
Alliance Jiu Jitsu: Alliance Association Jiu jitsu

Sportspeople from Rio de Janeiro (city)
1967 births
Living people
Brazilian practitioners of Brazilian jiu-jitsu
People awarded a black belt in Brazilian jiu-jitsu